Baker Island was an island on the Ohio River in Hancock County in the U.S. state of West Virginia. It was located south of Wellsville, Ohio.  It appears to have been dredged away sometime between 1960 and 1994, and no trace of it remains.

See also 
List of islands of West Virginia

Former islands of the United States